This is a list of notable people from Vienna, Austria.

A–C

 Carlo Abarth (1908-1979), Italian race car driver and tuner
 Gustav Abel (1902-1963), film architect and stage designer
 Othenio Abel (1875-1946), paleontologist and evolutionary biologist
 Wolfgang Abel (1905-1997), anthropologist
 Christoph Ignaz Abele (1627-1685), lawyer and court official
 Leo Aberer (born 1978), musician
 Walter Abish (born 1931), American writer
 Leopold Ackermann (1771-1831), theologian
 Antonie Adamberger (1790-1867), actress, fiance of Theodor Körner
 Karl Adamek (1910-2000), footballer and coach
 Alfred Adler founder of individual psychology
 Victor Adler social democrat and activist for the rights of workers
 Ilse Aichinger writer
 David Alaba Austrian footballer 
 Christopher Alexander England-based architect and design theorist; wrote book A Pattern Language (1977)
 Peter Altenberg fin de siècle writer and poet
 Wolfgang Ambros one of the founders of the musical movement Austropop
 Ludwig Anzengruber (1839–1889), an Austrian dramatist, novelist and poet.
 Walter Arlen  composer; music critic in LA Times
 Alfred Ritter von Arneth (1819–1897), an Austrian historian, wrote about Maria Theresa.
 Hans Asperger pediatrician; discoverer of Asperger syndrome
 Carl Auer von Welsbach chemist
 Haim Bar-Lev Israeli general and government minister
 Herbert Berghof late actor
 Polly Batic operatic mezzo-soprano 
 Eduard von Bauernfeld (1802–1890), Austrian dramatist.
 Vicki Baum novelist
 Alban Berg composer
 Turhan Bey actor
 Hedy Bienenfeld (1907–1976) Austrian-American Olympic swimmer
 Theodore Bikel actor and singer
 Karl Bitter (1867–1915) American architectural sculptor of memorials and residential works.
 John Paul Blass physician, biochemist and neurochemist
 Ludwig Boltzmann physicist
 Arik Brauer painter, poet and singer
 Eugene Braunwald cardiologist
 Vanessa Brown (born Smylla Brynd) actress 
 Martin Buber philosopher
 Ignaz Franz Castelli (1781–1862) an Austrian dramatist.
 Dorrit Cohn professor of comparative literature
 Heinrich Joseph von Collin (1771–1811), an Austrian dramatist.
 Carl Czerny (1791–1857) an Austrian composer, teacher and pianist.

D–G

 Georg Danzer songwriter
 Elfi von Dassanowsky film producer, pianist and singer
 Leopold Joseph von Daun (1705–1766), Austrian field marshal, later Prince of Thiano.
 Helmut Deutsch  pianist
 Oskar Deutsch (born 1963), entrepreneur and President of the Jewish Community of Vienna 
 Carl Ditters von Dittersdorf (1739–1799), Austrian composer, violinist and silvologist.
 Carl Djerassi chemist, novelist, and playwright; developer of the oral contraceptive pill
 Heimito von Doderer writer
 Georgia Doll theatre director, playwright and poet
 Peter Drucker economist
 Eva Duldig (born 1938)  Austrian-born Australian and Dutch tennis player, author
 Klaus Ebner writer
 Albert Ehrenstein writer
 Fanny Elssler (1810–1884), ballerina of the Romantic Period.
 Carl Esmond actor
 Constantin von Ettingshausen (1826–1897), botanist, studied of flora from the Tertiary era. 
 Falco instrumentalist and singer
 Robert Fein (1907-1975) Olympic Champion weightlifter
 Ferdinand I of Austria (1793–1875), Emperor of Austria.
 Ferdinand I of Bulgaria (1861–1948), Tsar of Bulgaria
 Ernst, Baron von Feuchtersleben (1806–1849), physician, poet and philosopher.
 Paul Feyerabend philosopher
 Otto Fischer (1901–1941) - (soccer) football player and coach
 Trude Fleischmann photographer
 Willi Forst actor, director, singer and writer
 Francis I of Austria & Francis II, Holy Roman Emperor (1768–1835) Holy Roman Emperor and Emperor of Austria.
 Viktor Frankl neurologist and psychiatrist; founder of logotherapy
 Archduke Franz Ferdinand of Austria (1863–1914) heir presumptive to the throne of Austria-Hungary.
 Franz Joseph I of Austria (1830-1916), Emperor of Austria.
 Sigmund Freud neurologist; founder of the psychoanalytic school of psychology
 Karl von Frisch animal psychologist, beekeeper and zoologist; co-recipient 1973 Nobel Prize in Physiology or Medicine
 Hilda Geiringer mathematician
 Karl Geiringer musicologist
 Amon Göth (1908–1946), Nazi SS concentration camp commandant executed for war crimes
 Maximilian Grabner (1905–1948), Nazi Gestapo chief in Auschwitz executed for crimes against humanity
 Ilona Graenitz (1943–2022), Austrian MP and MEP
 Franz Grillparzer (1791–1872), writer and dramatist.
 Victor Gruen architect
 Ruth Grützbauch astronomer
 Friedrich Gulda composer and pianist
 Alfred Guth (1908–1996) Austrian-born American water polo player, swimmer, and Olympic modern pentathlete

H–L

 Eduard Haas inventor of Pez candy
 Walter Hahn professional wrestler
 Wilhelm Karl Ritter von Haidinger (1795–1871) an Austrian mineralogist.
 Franz Ritter von Hauer (1822–1899), an Austrian geologist.
 Friedrich Hayek economist; co-recipient of the 1974 Nobel Memorial Prize in Economic Sciences
 Andre Heller artist, poet and songwriter
 Max Heller (born in Vienna in 1919) politician in Greenville, South Carolina, United States
 Gottfried Helnwein artist
  Dr. Otto Herschmann saber fencer, Olympic silver; 100-m freestyle in swimming, Olympic silver
 Theodor Herzl journalist; founder of modern political Zionism
 Mickey Hirschl Olympic-medal-winning wrestler, shot put and discus junior champion, weightlifting junior champion, and pentathlon champion
 Hugo von Hofmannsthal writer; founder of the Salzburg Festival
 Oskar Homolka actor
 Moritz Hörnes (1815–1868) an Austrian palaeontologist.
 Count Joseph Alexander Hübner (1811–1892) an Austrian diplomat.
 Friedensreich Hundertwasser architect and painter
 Wolfgang Hutter artist, painter and university art professor
 Ernst Jandl poet and writer
 Joseph I, Holy Roman Emperor (1678–1711), ruler of the Austrian Habsburg monarchy from 1705 until his death.
 Dora Kallmus photographer
 Martin Karplus theoretical chemist; co-recipient of the 2013 Nobel Prize in Chemistry
 Wenzel Anton, Prince of Kaunitz-Rietberg (1711–1794) an Austrian and Czech diplomat and statesman.
 Count Alajos Károlyi de Nagykároly (1825–1889) an Austro-Hungarian diplomat.
 Gina Kaus novelist
 Abraham Klausner (Austrian rabbi) 14th-century rabbi
 Melchior Klesl (1552–1630) an Austrian statesman and cardinal of the Roman Catholic church.
 Gustav Klimt painter
 Pina Kollar singer and songwriter
Alfred König (1913-1987) Austrian-Turkish Olympic sprinter
 Franz König Cardinal Archbishop
 Karl Kordesch chemist and inventor
 Hans Krankl footballer
 Karl Kraus satirist; publisher of the newspaper Die Fackel

 Klaus Kubinger psychologist, statistician, and university professor
 Hedy Lamarr actress and inventor
 Karl Landsteiner biologist and physician; discoverer of blood group; recipient of the 1930 Nobel Prize in Physiology or Medicine
 Fritz Lang director
 Ruth Langer (1921-1999), national champion swimmer
 Josef Lanner composer
 Niki Lauda entrepreneur and race car driver
 Henry Lehrman silent film director
 Lotte Lenya actor and singer
 Leopold II, Holy Roman Emperor (1747–1792) Archduke of Austria from 1790 to 1792.
 Leopold Lindtberg director
 Edie Locke, fashion journalist
 Konrad Lorenz behavioural scientist; co-recipient of the 1973 Nobel Prize in Physiology or Medicine
 Tilly Losch actress and dancer
Fritzi Löwy (1910–1994) Olympic swimmer

M–R

 Anna Mahler sculptor
 Gustav Mahler composer and conductor
 Natascha Mair ballet dancer
 Marie Antoinette (1755–1793), daughter of Empress Maria Theresa of Austria; last absolute Queen of France (1774–1792).
 Maria Theresa (1717–1780), daughter of Charles VI, Holy Roman Emperor; Queen of Bohemia and Hungary (1740–1780).
 Matthias, Holy Roman Emperor (1557–1619), Archduke of Austria from 1608 to 1619.
 Alice Mavrogordato painter, translator during the Nuremberg trials
 Maximilian I, Holy Roman Emperor (1459–1519) Holy Roman Emperor from 1508 until his death.
 Maximilian II, Holy Roman Emperor (1527–1576) Holy Roman Emperor from 1564 until his death.
 Maximilian I of Mexico (1832–1867), Emperor of Mexico.
 Friederike Mayröcker writer
 Lise Meitner physicist
 Carl Menger economist and founder of the Austrian School of economics
 Karl Menger mathematician and son of Carl Menger
 Ludwig von Mises economist
 Johann August Georg Edmund Mojsisovics von Mojsvar (1839–1907) an Austro-Hungarian geologist and palaeontologist.
 Adele Molnar voice actress of Piglett in the German dub of “Winnie the Poo”
 Elfriede Moser-Rath folklorist
 Karl Motesiczky psychoanalyst
Felix Josef von Mottl (1856–1911) an Austrian conductor and composer.
 Itzhak Nener, jurist who cofounded the International Association of Jewish Lawyers and Jurists and served as vice-president of Liberal International
 Johann Nestroy playwright
 Fritz Neugebauer second president of the Austrian National Council
 Peter C. Newman journalist
 Saul K. Padover historian and political scientist at The New School of Social Research in New York City, New York, US.
 Alfred Pal Croatian graphic designer and painter
 Bertha Pappenheim feminist
 Wolfgang Pauli physicist
 August von Pettenkofen (1822–1889) an Austrian painter.
 Ida Laura Pfeiffer (1797–1858), an Austrian explorer, travel writer and ethnographer.
 Caroline Pichler (1769–1843) an Austrian historical novelist.
 Anton Piëch lawyer, son-in-law of Ferdinand Porsche
 Karl Polanyi economic historian
 Alfred Polgar author and journalist
 Józef Poniatowski (1763–1813), a Polish general.
 Karl Popper philosopher
 Ellen Preis (Ellen Müller-Preis) (1912–2007) German-born Austrian Olympic champion foil fencer
 Helmut Qualtinger actor, cabaret performer and writer
 Doron Rabinovici writer 
 Ferdinand Raimund playwright
 Heinrich Rauchinger (1858–1942) painter
 Karl Leonhard Reinhold (1757–1823) an Austrian philosopher, popularised the work of Immanuel Kant.
 Shoshana Ribner—Israeli Olympic swimme
 Thomas Robinson, 2nd Baron Grantham (1738–1786) British statesman; Foreign Secretary, 1782/3.
 Alma Rosé violinist; killed at the Auschwitz concentration camp
 Stella Rotenberg poet and Shoah victim
 Rudolf II, Holy Roman Emperor (1552–1612), Archduke of Austria (1576–1608).

S–Z

 Felix Salten writer
 Fritz Saxl art historian
 Egon Schiele artist
 Romy Schneider actress
 Arthur Schnitzler story teller and playwright
 Arnold Schoenberg composer, music theorist and painter
 Joseph Schildkraut actor
 Erwin Schrödinger physicist; co-recipient of the 1933 Nobel Prize in Physics
 Franz Schubert composer
 Ernst Schwadronarchitect
 Moritz von Schwind (1804–1871) an Austrian painter.
 Peter Seisenbacher judoka
 Hans Selye physiologist
 Dovid Shmidel rabbi
 Matthias Sindelar footballer
 Josef Singer (1923-2009) Israeli President of Technion – Israel Institute of Technology
 Ignaz Sowinski (1858–1917) architect
 Josef von Sternberg film director
 Eduard Strauss composer
 Johann Strauss I (1804–1849) an Austrian composer of the Romantic Period.
 Johann Strauss II (1825–1899) composer
 Josef Strauss (1827–1870) composer
 Erich von Stroheim actor
 István Széchenyi (1791–1860) an Hungarian politician, political theorist and writer.
 Eduard Taaffe, 11th Viscount Taaffe (1833–1895) an Austrian statesman.
 Friedrich Torberg writer and journalist
 Maria von Trapp guitarist singer and deutergamy of Baron.Georg von Trapp
 Barbara Valentin actress
 Thomas Vanek professional ice hockey player
 Otto Wagner architect
 Bruno Walter conductor
 Christoph Waltz actor
 Katia Wagner Miss Earth Air 2013
 Erich Wasicky, Nazi SS pharmacist at Mauthausen concentration camp in charge of gassing victims; was executed
 Anton von Webern composer
 Otto Weininger philosopher
 Franz Werfel writer
 Christine Werner writer
 Friedrich von Wieser economist
 Geri Winkler mountaineer
 Ludwig Wittgenstein philosopher
 Joe Zawinul composer, keyboard player and jazz pianist
 Heinrich Ritter von Zeissberg (1839–1899) an Austrian historian.
 Alexander von Zemlinski composer
 Fred Zinnemann director
 Birgit Zotz writer
 Stefan Zweig writer
 Heinz Zednik tenor

See also

 List of Austrians

References 

Viennese
Viennese
 
People